Andrew Jones (6 October 1983 – 15 January 2023) was a Welsh screenwriter, producer and director of low-budget independent feature films, mainly in the horror genre.

One of his most successful properties was the Robert the Doll film series.

Jones died on 15 January 2023, at the age of 39.

Filmography

As director 
 The Amityville Asylum (2013)
 The Midnight Horror Show (a.k.a. Theatre of Fear) (2014)
 Valley of the Witch (2014)
 The Last House on Cemetery Lane (2015)
 Poltergeist Activity (2015)
 A Haunting at the Rectory (2015)
 Robert (2015)
 The Exorcism of Anna Ecklund (2016)
 The Curse of Robert the Doll (2016)
 The Toymaker (2017)
 Cabin 28 (2017)
 Werewolves of the Third Reich (2017)
 The Legend of Halloween Jack (2018)
 Bundy and the Green River Killer (2019)
 Robert Reborn (2019)

As producer 
 Night of the Living Dead: Resurrection (2012)
 Silent Night, Bloody Night: The Homecoming (2012)
 The Amityville Asylum (2013)
 The Midnight Horror Show (a.k.a. Theatre of Fear) (2014)
 Valley of the Witch (2014)
 The Last House on Cemetery Lane (2015)
 Poltergeist Activity (2015)
 A Haunting at the Rectory (2015)
 Robert (2015)
 Kill Kane (2016)
 The Exorcism of Anna Ecklund (2016)
 The Curse of Robert the Doll (2016)
 The Toymaker (2017)
 Cabin 28 (2017)
 Werewolves of the Third Reich (2017)
 The Legend of Halloween Jack (2018)
 Bundy and the Green River Killer (2019)
 Robert Reborn (2019)

References

External links
 
 Andrew Jones and the little film factory 'that could'.

1983 births
2023 deaths
British film directors
British male screenwriters
People educated at Olchfa School
People from Swansea
Welsh film directors
Welsh screenwriters